Racal Electronics plc was a British electronics company that was founded in 1950.

Listed on the London Stock Exchange and once a constituent of the FTSE 100 Index, Racal was a diversified company, offering products including voice loggers and data recorders, point of sale terminals, laboratory instruments and military electronics, including radio and radar. At its height it was the third largest British electronics firm; it operated throughout 110 countries worldwide and employed over 30,000 people. It was the parent company of Vodafone, before the mobile telephony provider was sold in 1991.

Racal was purchased by Thomson-CSF (now Thales Group) in 2000, thereby giving the French firm access to the UK defence and armaments market.

In 2001, Racal Instruments, Inc. became an independent company after a leveraged buyout from Thales.

In 2004, Racal Instruments, Inc. was acquired by EADS North America Defense and Test Services, Inc., which was then acquired by Astronics Corporation in 2014. The Racal brand now resides with Astronics Test Systems, a wholly owned subsidiary of Astronics Corporation.

Foundation
 
Racal was created in 1950 as Racal Ltd, the name being derived from the names of the partners, Raymond Brown and George Calder Cunningham.

Ernest Harrison joined the company as employee number 13 as an accountant, but later held the positions of chief buyer, personnel director and contract negotiator.

The first factory was located in Isleworth, Middlesex. On outgrowing this site it moved to Bracknell, Berkshire in 1954, enticed by a 99-year lease at four shillings and sixpence per square foot – and no rent reviews.

Although Racal had won a Royal Navy contract to build and supply a variant of the American Collins Model 51-J Radio Receiver, they were not granted a licence to build these sets by Collins Inc. This meant that Racal had to design and build a radio receiver from scratch. After almost bankrupting the company due to a £40,000 overspend, the result was the 'RA17' – in production from 1955 to at least 1973 – designed in co-operation with Trevor Wadley and using his Wadley Loop circuit.

Racal under Harrison
Harrison joined the company board in 1958, and as deputy managing director from 1961 helped Racal to obtain a Stock Market listing. Harrison became chairman in 1966, after co-founder Ray Brown was lured away by the Ministry of Defence. During his tenure, several major deals were achieved:
 Negotiation of a British Army battlefield radio contract (initially Larkspur, later part of Clansman) which secured the future of Racal
 The merger between Racal and British Communications Corporation, that bolstered Racal's radio business
 Buying Decca Radar in 1980 against competition from GEC, the rival British company led by Lord Weinstock
 Buying the British Rail Telecommunications network, to form the basis of Racal Telecom
 Creating and spinning-out the Vodafone mobile phone network
 Stopping a proposed takeover by Williams Holdings by demerging Chubb
 Investing in National Lottery company Camelot Group
 Selling Racal Telecom to Global Crossing
 Selling Racal's remaining defence and industrial electronics divisions to Thomson-CSF of France for £1.8 billion

Under Harrison, £1,000 invested in Racal in 1961 would have been worth £14.5million when he retired in 2000. Harrison received an estimated £25 million from the sale of Racal in 2000, and is estimated to have died with an accumulated total wealth of £40 million.

Decca Radar
In 1979, Racal bought Decca Radar forming Racal-Decca. Racal-Datacom conducted business in the United States.

Vodafone

In 1980, Harrison agreed a deal with Lord Weinstock of the General Electric Company to allow Racal to access some of GEC's tactical battlefield radio technology. Briefing the head of Racal's military radio division, Gerry Whent, to drive the company into commercial mobile radio, Whent visited GE's factory in Virginia, USA in 1980.

In 1982, Racal's newly formed subsidiary Racal Strategic Radio Ltd, under Whent, won one of the first two UK cellular telephone network licences; the other going to British Telecom. The network, known as Racal Vodafone, was 80% owned by Racal, with Millicom having 15% and the Hambros Technology Trust 5%.  Vodafone was launched on 1 January 1985. Racal Strategic Radio was renamed Racal Telecommunications Group Limited in 1985. On 29 December 1986, Racal Electronics bought out the minority shareholders of Vodafone for £110 million.

In 1988, 20% of Racal Telecom was floated on the London Stock Exchange. This would lead to the situation where Racal Electronics was valued at less than its shareholding in Racal Telecom. Harrison demerged Racal Telecom in October 1991, forcing a positive valuation on the rest of Racal (colloquially known in the City of London as "the rump"). Vodafone would later become the largest mobile network in the world and the highest valued company on the FTSE 100. Immediately following the demerger, Williams Holdings launched a takeover bid for Racal. The bid, valued at £740m, failed.

Racal Vadic
The company marketed modems under the name Racal-Vadic, and was among the first to offer 2400 baud modems in the early 1980s. Another name it used was Racal-Milgo.

Chubb Security
In 1984, Racal bought Chubb, a security company that manufactured safes and locks. In 1992, Chubb was demerged from Racal and was subsequently taken over by Willams Holdings in 1997.

Racal Telecoms
Racal re-established a telecoms division with a major government contract in 1988 and the acquisition of British Rail Telecommunications in 1995. This division of the former nationalised industry owned telecoms infrastructure laid across the rail network.

Racal Instrumentation
Consisted of Racal Recorders (Hythe, Southampton) and Racal Instruments (Burnham, near Slough). Racal acquired Thermionic Products in 1967, creating Racal Thermionics, renamed Racal Recorders in 1978.  Racal Recorders produced a wide range of magnetic tape recorders for multichannel voice recording and instrumentation recording applications.

Racal Redac
Provided Computer Aided Design (CAD) software and facilities, primarily for design of printed circuit boards; based at Tewkesbury, Gloucestershire.

National Lottery
In 1994, Camelot Group – in which Racal had a 22.5% share – won the franchise to operate the UK National Lottery. After one of the founder shareholders, GTECH, was bought out by Camelot this stake increased to 26.67%.

Break-up
In 1995, Racal expanded its defence businesses with the acquisition of the Thorn Sensors Group from Thorn EMI. In 1998, all Racal's defence businesses were reorganised under Racal Defence Electronics Ltd into Racal Radar Defence Systems, Racal Radio and Racal Thorn.

In October 1999, Racal decided to sell its telecoms business to the American communications group, Global Crossing, for £1bn.

In January 2000, Thomson-CSF announced a bid for the company: Racal became Thomson-CSF Racal plc, and later part of Thales plc with the renaming of the larger Thomson-CSF to Thales Group.

In December 2008, Racal Acoustics Ltd was acquired by Esterline Technologies, and has become part of their Communications Systems business.

References

External links 
 Thales Group website

 
Companies formerly listed on the London Stock Exchange
Defunct networking companies
Electronics companies of the United Kingdom
Defence companies of the United Kingdom
Electronics industry in London
Electronics companies established in 1950
Companies based in Surrey
Thales Group
Companies based in Bracknell
1950 establishments in England
History of telecommunications